Janakpur Zone was one of the fourteen zones of Nepal, comprising six districts, namely, Dhanusa, Dolakha, Mahottari, Ramechhap, Sarlahi and Sindhuli. Here is district wise List of Monuments which is in the Janakpur Zone.

Janakpur Zone
 List of monuments in Dhanusha District 
 List of monuments in Dolakha District 
 List of monuments in Mahottari District 
 List of monuments in Ramechhap District
 List of monuments in Sarlahi District 
 List of monuments in Sindhuli District

References

Janakpur Zone
Janakpur Zone